Alizz Islamic Bank (In Arabic: بنك العزّ الاسلامي) is a full-fledged Islamic bank operating in The Sultanate of Oman which launched on the 30 September 2013. Alizz Islamic Bank (SAOC) was established in accordance to Royal Decree No. 69/2012 which amended the banking law to include Islamic banking at licensed banks through either specialized banks or independent entities at the existing commercial banks.

Alizz Islamic Bank provides retail and corporate finance through branches, online and mobile devices. The total paid up capital is 100 million Omani Rials of which 40% was raised by public investors during the initial public offering (IPO). 60% was contributed by the bank's Promoters.

The bank is a closed joint stock company. Saleh bin Nasser Al Araimi is chairman of the board of directors while Sulaiman Al Harthi is the CEO.

Awards

In 2014, alizz islamic bank had won 'The Best Branch Automation Project in the Middle East' held by the Asian Banker Awards.

In 2015, alizz islamic bank won the 'Best Retail Bank' award by Islamic Business and Finance Awards 2015.

References

External links

 

2012 establishments in Oman
Islamic banks
Companies based in Muscat, Oman